La Cumbre Airport is a public use airport serving La Cumbre, a town in the Córdoba Province of Argentina.

See also

Transport in Argentina
List of airports in Argentina

References

External links 
OpenStreetMap - La Cumbre Airport
OurAirports - La Cumbre Airport

Airports in Argentina
Córdoba Province, Argentina